Brian Herbert Hamilton Talma (born 24 March 1965) is a Barbadian windsurfer. He competed at the 1988 Summer Olympics and the 1992 Summer Olympics.

References

External links
 
 

1965 births
Living people
Barbadian male sailors (sport)
Barbadian windsurfers
Olympic sailors of Barbados
Sailors at the 1988 Summer Olympics – Division II
Sailors at the 1992 Summer Olympics – Lechner A-390
Place of birth missing (living people)